Perotrochus deforgesi is a species of large sea snail, a marine gastropod mollusk in the family Pleurotomariidae, the slit snails.

Description
The length of the shell varies between 20 mm and 40 mm.

Distribution
This species occurs on the continental slope at depths between 350 m and 580 m in the Coral Sea.

References

External links
 To Encyclopedia of Life
 To MNHN Type collection
 To USNM Invertebrate Zoology Mollusca Collection
 To World Register of Marine Species
 
 Anseeuw P., Puillandre N., Utge J. & Bouchet P. (2015). Perotrochus caledonicus (Gastropoda: Pleurotomariidae) revisited: descriptions of new species from the South-West Pacific. European Journal of Taxonomy. 134: 1-23

Pleurotomariidae
Gastropods described in 1990